Nová Ves is a municipality and village in České Budějovice District in the South Bohemian Region of the Czech Republic. It has about 800 inhabitants.

Administrative parts
The village of Hůrka is an administrative part of Nová Ves.

History
The first written mention of Nová Ves is from 1564. The village was probably established between 1557 and 1564.

References

Villages in České Budějovice District